Partick Burgh Hall is a municipal facility in Burgh Hall Street, Partick, Scotland. The hall, which was the headquarters of Partick Burgh Council in the early 20th century, is a Category B listed building.

History

The building was commissioned to replace a small Palazzo style building in Anderson Street which had served as the administration centre for the burgh and had been completed in 1853. After a period of rapid population expansion associated with the growth in the shipbuilding industry, civic leaders decided to procure a purpose-built burgh hall: the site selected was the southern section of piece of open ground, the rest of which was developed at the same time as Hamilton Crescent, the home of the West of Scotland Cricket Club.

The new building, which was designed by William Leiper in the French Renaissance style, was completed in 1872. The design involved an asymmetrical main frontage with thirteen bays facing Burgh Hall Street; the western section of five bays, the middle three of which projected slightly forward, formed the main frontispiece; there were windows in the middle three bays on the ground floor with an arched doorway in the western bay; there were panels carved by John Mossman depicting compassion, truth and justice above the ground floor windows and a large round-headed window in the middle bay on the first floor with a pediment above; there was also an ornate bell tower at roof level.

The burgh hall was the headquarters of Partick Burgh Council until the burgh was annexed by Glasgow in 1912.

In June 2019 it was announced that the hall, which continues to function as a community centre, would also become a "Space for Growth Hub" providing support for start-up businesses.

See also
 List of listed buildings in Glasgow/6

References

Partick
Government buildings completed in 1872
1872 establishments in Scotland
Partick
Category B listed buildings in Glasgow
Listed government buildings in Scotland